Christopher High School is a co-educational public school in Gilroy, California. It is one of two public comprehensive high schools in the city and has an approximate enrollment of 1,900 students. It is a part of the Gilroy Unified School District.

The school is named for the Christopher family, owner of the Christopher Ranch, a local garlic farm that is one of the largest employers in Gilroy.  Christopher donated 10 acres of land and started an endowment for the school with an initial investment of $75,000.

Athletics

See also 
Gilroy Unified School District

References

External links
 Christopher High School Website

High schools in Santa Clara County, California
Public high schools in California
Gilroy, California
Educational institutions with year of establishment missing